Blue Book is the commonly used name for a United States Marine Corps document officially known as Marine Corps Bulletin 1400 (MCBul 1400).  MCBul 1400 serves to publish lineal precedence and seniority information on officers in the U.S. Marine Corps and U.S. Marine Corps Reserve.  It is published annually by the U.S. Marine Corps' Deputy Commandant, Manpower and Reserve Affairs.  In addition to determining seniority among officers, it is also used to determine promotion eligibility.

External links
 U.S. Marine Corps Blue Book

United States Marine Corps